Comitas aldingensis is an extinct species of sea snail, a marine gastropod mollusc in the family Pseudomelatomidae.

Description

Distribution
This extinct marine species was found in upper Eocene strata off Aldinga Beach, South Australia. The type specimen is in the Auckland Museum.

References

 A.W.B. Powell (1944), The Australian Tertiary Mollusca of the Family Turridae
 A.W.B. Powell (1944), Records of the Auckland Institute and Museum., vol. 3 no. 1, p. 1-68

External links
 Auckland Museum: Comitas aldingensis (holotype)
 Darragh, T. A. (2017). Further Mollusca from the late Eocene Pallinup Formation, Eucla Basin, Western Australia. Records of the West Australian Museum 32: 29-100

aldingensis
Gastropods described in 1944
Gastropods of Australia